The following species in the flowering plant genus Hibiscus are accepted by Plants of the World Online. There have been multiple ancient polyploidization events in this genus.

Hibiscus acapulcensis 
Hibiscus acetosella 
Hibiscus acicularis 
Hibiscus aculeatus 
Hibiscus adscensionis 
Hibiscus aethiopicus 
Hibiscus ahlensis 
Hibiscus allenii 
Hibiscus altissimus 
Hibiscus amambayensis 
Hibiscus amazonicus 
Hibiscus ambanitazensis 
Hibiscus ambovombensis 
Hibiscus analalavensis 
Hibiscus andersonii 
Hibiscus andongensis 
Hibiscus aneuthe 
Hibiscus angolensis 
Hibiscus ankaramyensis 
Hibiscus ankeranensis 
Hibiscus antanossarum 
Hibiscus aphelus 
Hibiscus apodus 
Hibiscus aponeurus 
Hibiscus archboldianus 
Hibiscus arenicola 
Hibiscus argutus 
Hibiscus aridicola 
Hibiscus aridus 
Hibiscus arnhemensis 
Hibiscus arnottianus 
Hibiscus articulatus 
Hibiscus aruensis 
Hibiscus australensis 
Hibiscus austrinus 
Hibiscus austroyunnanensis 
Hibiscus bacalusius 
Hibiscus barbosae 
Hibiscus benedicti 
Hibiscus benensis 
Hibiscus benguellensis 
Hibiscus bennettii 
Hibiscus bequaertii 
Hibiscus berberidifolius 
Hibiscus bernieri 
Hibiscus bicalyculatus 
Hibiscus bifurcatus 
Hibiscus biseptus 
Hibiscus bojerianus 
Hibiscus boranensis 
Hibiscus borealis 
Hibiscus borneensis 
Hibiscus boryanus 
Hibiscus bowersiae 
Hibiscus brachychlaenus 
Hibiscus brachysiphonius 
Hibiscus brackenridgei 
Hibiscus bragliae 
Hibiscus brennanii 
Hibiscus bricchettii 
Hibiscus burtt-davyi 
Hibiscus byrnesii 
Hibiscus cabralensis 
Hibiscus caerulescens 
Hibiscus caesius 
Hibiscus calcicola 
Hibiscus calodendron 
Hibiscus calyculatus 
Hibiscus calyphyllus 
Hibiscus cameronii 
Hibiscus campanulatus 
Hibiscus cannabinus 
Hibiscus castroi 
Hibiscus celebicus 
Hibiscus ceratophorus 
Hibiscus cerradoensis 
Hibiscus chancoae 
Hibiscus chapadensis 
Hibiscus chrysinocolla 
Hibiscus chrysochaetus 
Hibiscus citrinus 
Hibiscus clayii 
Hibiscus clypeatus 
Hibiscus coatesii 
Hibiscus coccineus 
Hibiscus cochlearifer 
Hibiscus coddii 
Hibiscus colimensis 
Hibiscus columnaris 
Hibiscus commixtus 
Hibiscus comoensis 
Hibiscus comorensis 
Hibiscus conceptionis 
Hibiscus congestiflorus 
Hibiscus conradsii 
Hibiscus contortus 
Hibiscus convolvulaceus 
Hibiscus cooperi 
Hibiscus cordifolius 
Hibiscus corditectus 
Hibiscus corymbosus 
Hibiscus costatus 
Hibiscus coulteri 
Hibiscus crassinervius 
Hibiscus cuanzensis 
Hibiscus cucurbitaceus 
Hibiscus dalbertisii 
Hibiscus dasycalyx 
Hibiscus debeerstii 
Hibiscus decaspermus 
Hibiscus deflersii 
Hibiscus denudatus 
Hibiscus dimidiatus 
Hibiscus dinteri 
Hibiscus dioscorides 
Hibiscus diriffan 
Hibiscus discolorifolius 
Hibiscus discophorus 
Hibiscus divaricatus 
Hibiscus diversifolius 
Hibiscus dongolensis 
Hibiscus donianus 
Hibiscus drummondii 
Hibiscus elatus 
Hibiscus elegans 
Hibiscus elliottiae 
Hibiscus ellipticifolius 
Hibiscus ellisii 
Hibiscus elongatifolius 
Hibiscus engleri 
Hibiscus eriospermus 
Hibiscus erlangeri 
Hibiscus erodiifolius 
Hibiscus escobariae 
Hibiscus exellii 
Hibiscus fabiana 
Hibiscus fallax 
Hibiscus fanambanensis 
Hibiscus faulknerae 
Hibiscus ferreirae 
Hibiscus ferrugineus 
Hibiscus ficalhoanus 
Hibiscus fijiensis 
Hibiscus fischeri 
Hibiscus flagelliformis 
Hibiscus flavifolius 
Hibiscus flavoroseus 
Hibiscus fleckii 
Hibiscus floccosus 
Hibiscus fluminis-aprili 
Hibiscus fluvialis 
Hibiscus forsteri 
Hibiscus fragilis 
Hibiscus fragrans 
Hibiscus fritzscheae 
Hibiscus fryxellii 
Hibiscus fugosioides 
Hibiscus furcellatus 
Hibiscus fuscus 
Hibiscus gagnepainii 
Hibiscus garambensis 
Hibiscus genevii 
Hibiscus geranioides 
Hibiscus gilletii 
Hibiscus glaber 
Hibiscus glandulifer 
Hibiscus goldsworthii 
Hibiscus goossensii 
Hibiscus gossweileri 
Hibiscus gourmania 
Hibiscus grandidieri 
Hibiscus grandiflorus 
Hibiscus grandistipulatus 
Hibiscus greenwayi 
Hibiscus gregoryi 
Hibiscus grewioides 
Hibiscus guerkeanus 
Hibiscus gwandensis 
Hibiscus hamabo 
Hibiscus hasslerianus 
Hibiscus haynaldii 
Hibiscus henningsianus 
Hibiscus heterophyllus 
Hibiscus hilarianus 
Hibiscus hildebrandtii 
Hibiscus hirtus 
Hibiscus hispidissimus 
Hibiscus hochreutineri 
Hibiscus hochstetteri 
Hibiscus hockii 
Hibiscus holstii 
Hibiscus homblei 
Hibiscus hoshiarpurensis 
Hibiscus huillensis 
Hibiscus hundtii 
Hibiscus indicus 
Hibiscus inimicus 
Hibiscus insularis 
Hibiscus isalensis 
Hibiscus itirapinensis 
Hibiscus jacksonianus 
Hibiscus jaliscensis 
Hibiscus kabuyeanus 
Hibiscus keilii 
Hibiscus kenneallyi 
Hibiscus kirkii 
Hibiscus kirstyae 
Hibiscus kitaibelifolius 
Hibiscus kochii 
Hibiscus kokio 
Hibiscus krichauffianus 
Hibiscus labordei 
Hibiscus laevis 
Hibiscus lamalama 
Hibiscus lasiococcus 
Hibiscus laurinus 
Hibiscus lavateroides 
Hibiscus laxiflorus 
Hibiscus ledermannii 
Hibiscus leeuwenii 
Hibiscus leptocladus 
Hibiscus leviseminus 
Hibiscus liliastrum 
Hibiscus liliazanza 
Hibiscus liliiflorus 
Hibiscus loandensis 
Hibiscus lobatus 
Hibiscus lonchosepalus 
Hibiscus longifilus 
Hibiscus longisepalus 
Hibiscus ludwigii 
Hibiscus lunariifolius 
Hibiscus macilwraithensis 
Hibiscus macranthus 
Hibiscus macrogonus 
Hibiscus macrophyllus 
Hibiscus macropodus 
Hibiscus maculatus 
Hibiscus macverryi 
Hibiscus makinoi 
Hibiscus malacophyllus 
Hibiscus malacospermus 
Hibiscus mandrarensis 
Hibiscus mangindranensis 
Hibiscus manuripiensis 
Hibiscus marenitensis 
Hibiscus mariae 
Hibiscus marlothianus 
Hibiscus martianus 
Hibiscus masasianus 
Hibiscus mastersianus 
Hibiscus matogrossensis 
Hibiscus mechowii 
Hibiscus megistanthus 
Hibiscus menzeliae 
Hibiscus meraukensis 
Hibiscus merxmuelleri 
Hibiscus mesnyi 
Hibiscus meyeri 
Hibiscus meyeri-johannis 
Hibiscus micranthus 
Hibiscus minkebeensis 
Hibiscus minutibracteolus 
Hibiscus mongallaensis 
Hibiscus moscheutos 
Hibiscus moxicoensis 
Hibiscus muhamedis 
Hibiscus multiformis 
Hibiscus multilobatus 
Hibiscus mutabilis 
Hibiscus mutatus 
Hibiscus naegelei 
Hibiscus nanuzae 
Hibiscus nelsonii 
Hibiscus ngokbanakii 
Hibiscus nigricaulis 
Hibiscus noldeae 
Hibiscus noli-tangere 
Hibiscus normanii 
Hibiscus obtusilobus 
Hibiscus okavangensis 
Hibiscus orbicularis 
Hibiscus ottoi 
Hibiscus ovalifolius 
Hibiscus owariensis 
Hibiscus oxaliflorus 
Hibiscus pachycarpus 
Hibiscus pacificus 
Hibiscus palmatifidus 
Hibiscus palmatus 
Hibiscus paludicola 
Hibiscus panduriformis 
Hibiscus paolii 
Hibiscus papuanus 
Hibiscus paramutabilis 
Hibiscus parkinsonii 
Hibiscus partitus 
Hibiscus paulae 
Hibiscus pedunculatus 
Hibiscus peralbus 
Hibiscus peripteroides 
Hibiscus perrieri 
Hibiscus peruvianus 
Hibiscus peterianus 
Hibiscus petherickii 
Hibiscus phoeniceus 
Hibiscus phyllochlaenus 
Hibiscus physaloides 
Hibiscus platanifolius 
Hibiscus platycalyx 
Hibiscus pleijtei 
Hibiscus poeppigii 
Hibiscus pohlii 
Hibiscus poilanei 
Hibiscus ponticus 
Hibiscus praeteritus 
Hibiscus propulsator 
Hibiscus prunifolius 
Hibiscus pruriosus 
Hibiscus pseudohirtus 
Hibiscus pseudotiliaceus 
Hibiscus pterocarpoides 
Hibiscus pulvinulifer 
Hibiscus purpureus 
Hibiscus purpusii 
Hibiscus pusillus 
Hibiscus quattenensis 
Hibiscus radiatus 
Hibiscus reekmansii 
Hibiscus reflexus 
Hibiscus rhabdotospermus 
Hibiscus rhodanthus 
Hibiscus ribifolius 
Hibiscus riceae 
Hibiscus richardsiae 
Hibiscus richardsonii 
Hibiscus rosa-sinensis 
Hibiscus rostellatus 
Hibiscus rubriflorus 
Hibiscus rupicola 
Hibiscus rutenbergii 
Hibiscus sabdariffa 
Hibiscus × sabei 
Hibiscus sabiensis 
Hibiscus saddii 
Hibiscus sakamaliensis 
Hibiscus sankowskyorum 
Hibiscus saponarius 
Hibiscus saxatilis 
Hibiscus saxicola 
Hibiscus schinzii 
Hibiscus schizopetalus 
Hibiscus schlechteri 
Hibiscus schweinfurthii 
Hibiscus sciadiolepidus 
Hibiscus scindicus 
Hibiscus scotellii 
Hibiscus scottii 
Hibiscus sebastianii 
Hibiscus seineri 
Hibiscus selesiensis 
Hibiscus sepikensis 
Hibiscus setulosus 
Hibiscus shirensis 
Hibiscus sidiformis 
Hibiscus similis 
Hibiscus sineaculeatus 
Hibiscus sinosyriacus 
Hibiscus skeneae 
Hibiscus socotranus 
Hibiscus solanifolius 
Hibiscus somalensis 
Hibiscus sororius 
Hibiscus sparseaculeatus 
Hibiscus spartioides 
Hibiscus spiralis 
Hibiscus splendens 
Hibiscus splendidus 
Hibiscus squamosus 
Hibiscus squarrulosus 
Hibiscus sreenarayanianus 
Hibiscus stenanthus 
Hibiscus stenophyllus 
Hibiscus sterculiifolius 
Hibiscus stewartii 
Hibiscus storckii 
Hibiscus striatus 
Hibiscus sturtii 
Hibiscus subdiversifolius 
Hibiscus subreniformis 
Hibiscus sudanensis 
Hibiscus sulfuranthus 
Hibiscus superbus 
Hibiscus surattensis 
Hibiscus symonii 
Hibiscus syriacus 
Hibiscus taiwanensis 
Hibiscus talbotii 
Hibiscus teijsmannii 
Hibiscus tenorii 
Hibiscus thegaleus 
Hibiscus thespesianus 
Hibiscus tiliaceus 
Hibiscus tisserantii 
Hibiscus torrei 
Hibiscus townsvillensis 
Hibiscus tozerensis 
Hibiscus trichonychius 
Hibiscus tridactylites 
Hibiscus trilineatus 
Hibiscus trilobus 
Hibiscus trionum 
Hibiscus uncinellus 
Hibiscus upingtoniae 
Hibiscus urticifolius 
Hibiscus varians 
Hibiscus verbasciformis 
Hibiscus verdcourtii 
Hibiscus vitifolius 
Hibiscus vohipahensis 
Hibiscus volkensii 
Hibiscus waimeae 
Hibiscus waterbergensis 
Hibiscus watsonii 
Hibiscus whytei 
Hibiscus wilsonii 
Hibiscus windischii 
Hibiscus yunnanensis 
Hibiscus zanzibaricus 
Hibiscus zonatus 
Hibiscus zygomorphus

References

Hibiscus